The 2009 season was Daegu F.C.'s 7th season in South Korea's K-League.

Season summary

This season would transpire to be one of the worst, if not the worst, in the club's history.  In a now expanded league of 15 clubs, thanks to new entrant Gangwon FC, Daegu would finish last. Jang Nam-Seok, who had played for the club since 2006 and has been a prolific scorer for the club, was appointed captain for the 2009 season.   While defensively, there had been improvements, the club lost its attacking focus of the previous season.  The leading scorer of the previous season, Lee Keun-Ho had completed his contract and moved to Japanese club Júbilo Iwata and Eninho, who had been one of the club's best performing imports, transferred to Jeonbuk Hyundai Motors.  Their replacements, Émile Mbamba and Lazar Popović, were not of the same calibre, and would be released mid-season.

Only five games were won all season in the K-League.  That even five games were won was fortunate, and this number is somewhat deceptive as it was as late as the 21st round that the club had but a single win.  It was only a late season string of four consecutive wins that saved the club's blushes.  This late season revival was far too late to lift the club from the foot of the table, from where it had been anchored since round 11 of the competition.  An midseason incoming transfer, Leo would score four goals while midfielder draftee Lee Seul-Ki scored three goals from 25 games.  That a midfielder playing as an occasional part-time forward would be the club's second highest scorer only highlighted the club's lack of offensive penetration.

In the FA Cup, Daegu made it to the quarterfinals, beating Gyeongnam FC in a penalty shootout in the round of 16.  In the quarterfinal itself, against Daejeon Citizen, the game finished as a one all draw, Daegu's goal coming from Lee Seul-Ki.  For the second consecutive match, the result would come down to a penalty shootout. This time, Daegu lost out.  In the league cup, now known as the Peace Cup Korea 2009 finished third in their group, one point away from qualifying for the knockout phase of the cup.  Cho Hyung-Ik, another midfielder, would be the club's highest scorer in the competition with three goals.

Off the field, Park Jong-Sun was elected as the third representative director of Daegu FC on 11 May 2009.  Lee Dae-Sub and Choi Jong-Joon were the preceding representative directors.  Daegu FC also signed a memorandum of understanding with the regionalised 4th level of Argentinian football Torneo Argentino B side Deportivo Coreano on 31 August 2009.  It was hoped that this will lead to promising Argentinean players playing for the club.

The 2009 season also saw a change in the club's kit provider; Joma replaced previous supplier Lotto Sport Italia.

On December 22, 2009, Daegu FC appointed Lee Young-jin as manager to lead the club for the 2010 season.  Lee, who has previously coached FC Seoul, replaced Byun Byung-Joo who had been manager since 2006.  Byun resigned after being embroiled in a scandal involving a player's agent and payoffs for selecting specific players.

Squad

Players In/Out

In

Out

Statistics
Updated to games played 1 November 2009.

|}

K-League

Matches

Standings

Results summary

Results by round

Korean FA Cup

Matches

Peace Cup Korea

Matches

Standings

See also
Daegu F.C.

References

External links
Daegu FC Official website  

2009
Daegu